Abidemi Ayodeji Ogunmolu, also known as Bidemi Olaoba, is a Nigerian gospel singer, songwriter and music composer. He is known for singing Gospel HighLife music in a Fuji Style.

Early life 
Olaoba was born in a Christian home in Lagos, Nigeria into a family of six. He comes from Ikale Okitipupa, Ondo State. Bidemi studied Civil Engineering at the Yaba College Of Technology, Lagos and Economics at the University Of Lagos, Nigeria.

Musical career 
Olaoba Started his musical career as a worship leader in the choir at Christ Apostolic Church and became involved in the CAC Music Ministry and Redeemed Christian Church of God. After beginning his official career, Olaoba released his first single, "Final Say", in 2016. He became known for his popular phrase "The Bible Says".

Olaoba was invited to perform Marathon Praise, an event organized by the Redeemed Christian Church of God, and then gained popularity. He has six studio singles, two live performance compilations, and collaborations with gospel artists. Olaoba travelled to Europe, America and African nations, he held virtual concerts and is the pioneer of the virtual concert Unrestricted Praise, which started in 2020 and featured gospel artists including Buchi, Tope Alabi, Mike Abdul, Adeleke Adeboye, Eben, and Samie Okposo.

Olaoba performed at Nigeria's biggest gospel gatherings, including the Marathon Messiah's Praise concert by the Redeemed Christian Church Of God, Festival Of Life (Dubai, Dublin, Italy and United Kingdom), MASS, HI-impact Praise, and COZA.

Discography

Studio albums 

 Final Say (2016)
 Bonjour (2017)
 My Life (2018)
 Baba (2019)
 Holy Gyration (2020)

Live performance compilation albums 

 Winning Praise (2019)
 Mass (2020)

Videography

References 

Nigerian songwriters
Living people
Year of birth missing (living people)
Yaba College of Technology alumni
University of Lagos alumni
Singers from Lagos
Nigerian gospel singers